Lucheng may refer to the following locations in China:

Districts
Lucheng District, Changzhi, Shanxi
Lucheng District, Wenzhou, Zhejiang

Subdistricts
Lucheng, Kangding, seat of Kangding County, Sichuan
Lucheng Subdistrict, Yidu, in Yidu, Yichang, Hubei
Lucheng, Yueyang, in Yunxi District, Yueyang, Hunan
Lucheng Subdistrict, Changzhou, in Qishuyan District, Changzhou, Jiangsu
Lucheng Subdistrict, Qufu, Shandong

Towns
Lucheng, Funan County, Anhui
Lucheng, Lujiang County, Anhui
Lucheng, Beijing, in Tongzhou District, Beijing
Lucheng, Jincheng, in Lingchuan County, Shanxi
Lucheng, Yunnan, in Chuxiong City, Yunnan

Station
 , in Lucheng District, Changzhi, Shanxi, a station on Handan–Changzhi railway
Lucheng station (Beijing Subway) on Beijing Subway Line 6
Lucheng station (Changzhou Metro) on Changzhou Metro Line 2